Set You Free or Set U Free may refer to:

Albums
 Set You Free (album), by Gary Allan, 2013
 Set You Free, by Chisel, 1997
 Set You Free, by Nomos, 1997
 Set You Free, by Tammy Trent, 2000
 Set You Free: Gene Clark in the Byrds 1964–1973, by Gene Clark, 2004

Songs
 "Set You Free" (N-Trance song), 1995
 "Set You Free" (The Black Keys song), 2003
 "Set U Free" (Keshia Chanté song), 2011
 "Set U Free" (Planet Soul song), 1995
 "Set You Free", by Ol' Skool, 1997
 "Set You Free", by Poison from Crack a Smile... and More!, 2000
 "Set You Free", by Wale from Wow... That's Crazy, 2019

See also
 "I'll Set You Free", a 1988 song by The Bangles
 Love Will Set You Free (disambiguation)
 "Set You Free This Time", a 1966 song by The Byrds
 Set Me Free (disambiguation)